The Aurora Green Diamond is a  vivid green diamond with VS2 clarity. In May 2016, the Aurora Green became the largest vivid green diamond to ever sell at auction. The record was previous held by a 2.54 carat Fancy Vivid Green VS1 diamond that was sold by Sotheby’s on November 17, 2009, for $1.22 million per carat according to the Diamond Investment & Intelligence Center. On May 31, 2016, the diamond, which was originally owned by Scarselli Diamonds was sold by Christie's for a record price per carat of $3.3 million to Chinese jewelry company Chow Tai Fook, totaling $16.8 million.

Current Records
– The largest Fancy Vivid Green Diamond ever to be offered at auction.
– The most expensive Green Diamond in the world to be sold at auction.
– The highest per carat price ever sold for any Green Diamond in the world at auction.
– The most expensive Green Diamond to be sold in Asia.

See also
List of famous diamonds

References

Diamonds originating in Brazil
Individual diamonds
Green diamonds